Msgr James Hourihan (January 4, 1907 - July 8, 1997) was an Irish born Roman Catholic priest who long serving pastor to St. Andrew's Catholic Church (Pasadena, California).

Early life, education, ordination
James Hourihan was born in Dunmanway, County Cork, Ireland in 1907, to Timothy and Julia (O'Neil) Hourihan. He has two brothers, John Emmanuel and Brendan Hourihan, both Carmelite priests.  He was educated at St Finbarr's College in Cork and trained for the priesthood at the missionary college of All Hallows College, Dublin.

Assignments
Following ordination in 1931 in All Hallows, he went to America where at St. Andrew's he served as assistant pastor from 1931-1936 and then as pastor for 27 years from 1955 to 1982. Hourihan published a 224-page history of St. Andrew's parish.

Honour and Award
In 1962 Fr Hourihan was honoured with the church title of Monsignor by Pope John XXXIII, in recognition of his contribution to the church.

Death and burial
Msgr Hourihan died on the 8th of July 1997 and is buried in Calvary Cemetery, Los Angeles.

Publications
 The History of St. Andrew's Parish, 1886-1986 by James Hourihan, Custombook Inc., New York, 1986.

References

1907 births
1997 deaths
Religious leaders from California
People from County Cork
Alumni of All Hallows College, Dublin
People from Dunmanway
Irish emigrants to the United States
People from Pasadena, California
20th-century Irish Roman Catholic priests
Catholics from California
20th-century American Roman Catholic priests